Gunnewin is a rural locality in the Maranoa Region, Queensland, Australia. In the  Gunnewin had a population of 59 people.

Geography 
The former Injune railway line traversed the locality. Komine is a neighbourhood near the former Komine railway station in the far north of the locality. Okoro is a neighbourhood near the former Okora railway station in the north of the locality.

History 
Komine railway station was named by the Queensland Railways Department on 17 August 1920. The name is an Aboriginal name for a  local large creek.

Barramundi State School opened circa 1921. Circa 1925 it was renamed Komine State School. It closed in 1936.

Okoro railway station was named on 22 June 1922. It is an Aboriginal word meaning Brigalow (a type of tree).

The name Gunnewin was first used in 1926 and is an Aboriginal word meaning ringtailed possum or possum trap. It was used for the railway station name from 17 August 1940.

Gunnewin Provisional School and Gunnewin West Provisional School both opened on 27 February 1922 as half-time schools (meaning they shared a single teacher between them). Both schools closed later in 1922.

Upper Injune Provisional School opened on 11 October 1926. In 1928 it was renamed Gunnewin West State School. It closed on 1945.

Gunnewin State School opened circa 1934 and closed circa 1944.

In the  Gunnewin had a population of 59 people.

References 

Maranoa Region
Localities in Queensland